The Spartan 12W Executive was a tricycle gear post-war development of the Spartan 7W Executive, produced by the Spartan Aircraft Company.  The 12W was intended to have higher performance and be more economical than the 7W.

Design and development
After World War II, Spartan aircraft Company president J. Paul Getty was unsure of the market potential of a new executive aircraft. After building just one model 12W Executive (NX21962), the manufacturer lost interest in luxury aircraft and focused on constructing travel trailers instead. The sole example produced was owned by Spartan Aircraft and employed at their flight training school in Tulsa, Oklahoma.

The Spartan 12W Executive features magnesium alloy wings and tail surfaces and range extending wing tip-tanks. The magnesium alloy skin quickly corroded and was replaced with aluminum alloy. The tip-tanks were also removed.

Aircraft on display
Spartan Aircraft flight training school eventually sold the Spartan 12W. Over the years, the aircraft passed through a number of private owners' hands. The 12W was restored in 1967 and in 2012 was retired. The 12W is now on static display at the Tulsa Air and Space Museum & Planetarium.

Specifications

References

Notes

Bibliography

 Davisson, Budd. "Spartan Executive." Air Progress, March 1971.
 Donald, David. Encyclopedia of World Aircraft. Etobicoke, Ontario, Canada: Prospero Books;, 1997. .
 Taylor, Michael J. H. Jane's Encyclopedia of Aviation. London: Studio Editions, 1989. .

External links

Photo of model 12W
Photo of model 12W

1940s United States civil utility aircraft
Low-wing aircraft
Spartan Aircraft Company aircraft
Single-engined tractor aircraft
Aircraft first flown in 1946